Felix Barrientos (born 20 November 1967) is a former professional tennis player from the Philippines.

Biography
Barrientos was a highly ranked player on the juniors circuit, most notably reaching the semi-finals of the boys' singles at the 1985 Wimbledon Championships.

Having attended Colegio San Agustin in Makati, he played American collegiate tennis at Louisiana State University (LSU) on a scholarship and was a member of the team which reached the final of the 1988 NCAA Division I Men's Tennis Championships. In the final against Stanford he won in the singles against Patrick McEnroe, but LSU still lost the finals series 2–5.

A right-handed player, Barrientos won several medals for the Philippines at the Southeast Asian Games, three of them gold medals, including in the men's singles when Manila hosted the event in 1991.

As a professional player he was ranked as high as 180, breaking into the top 200 after he made the quarter-finals of the Hong Kong Open in 1991, during which he had a win over Kevin Curren. His other singles main draw appearance on the ATP Tour came at the 1991 Queen's Club Championships, then at Taipei the following year, for first round losses to Pat Cash and John Fitzgerald respectively.

Barrientos was a regular member of the Philippines Davis Cup team during his career and featured in a total of 15 ties, for an 18/5 win–loss record in singles and overall record of 26/10. In 1991 he helped the Philippines reach the World Group playoffs.

Now based in Singapore, Barrientos works in private banking for LGT.

References

External links
 
 
 

1967 births
Living people
Filipino male tennis players
LSU Tigers tennis players
Sportspeople from Manila
Filipino expatriates in Singapore
Southeast Asian Games medalists in tennis
Southeast Asian Games gold medalists for the Philippines
Southeast Asian Games competitors for the Philippines
Southeast Asian Games silver medalists for the Philippines
Southeast Asian Games bronze medalists for the Philippines
Competitors at the 1991 Southeast Asian Games
Competitors at the 1993 Southeast Asian Games
Filipino expatriate sportspeople in the United States